The 1900 State of the Union Address was written by William McKinley, the 25th president of the United States.  He began it with these words: "At the outgoing of the old and the incoming of the new century you begin the last session of the Fifty-sixth Congress with evidences on every hand of individual and national prosperity and with proof of the growing strength and increasing power for good of Republican institutions."
It was the last of the four addresses given by McKinley. It was given as a written message to the 56th United States Congress.  He did not deliver it as a speech.

References

Presidency of William McKinley
State of the Union addresses
56th United States Congress
State of the Union Address
State of the Union Address
State of the Union Address
State of the Union Address
State of the Union